Donald Erwin Wilson (August 12, 1932 – February 3, 2002) was a rear admiral in the United States Navy.

Biography
Wilson was born in Holway, Wisconsin, on August 12, 1932. He graduated with a M.S. in Management from San Diego State University in 1955, having earned a B.S. in Accounting the previous year. Wilson married Leanna Draper and they had three children.

He died of cancer on February 3, 2002, at Inova Fairfax Hospital in Woodburn, Fairfax County, Virginia, and is buried at Arlington National Cemetery.

Career
After joining the Navy, Wilson was assigned to Miramar Naval Air Station. During the Vietnam War, he was stationed in Saigon. Later he would serve in the office of the Assistant Secretary of the Navy (Installations and Logistics). In 1977, he was given command of the Navy Supply Corps School. He served his final assignment at Fort Wadsworth. Wilson retired in 1987.

Awards he received include the Navy Distinguished Service Medal, the Bronze Star Medal with valor device, the Meritorious Service Medal, and the Vietnam Gallantry Cross.

References

External links

 Donald Erwin Wilson at ArlingtonCemetery.net, an unofficial website

1932 births
2002 deaths
People from Taylor County, Wisconsin
Military personnel from Wisconsin
United States Navy admirals
Recipients of the Navy Distinguished Service Medal
Recipients of the Gallantry Cross (Vietnam)
United States Navy personnel of the Vietnam War
San Diego State University alumni
Burials at Arlington National Cemetery